Koritna may refer to the following places in Croatia:
 Koritna, Osijek-Baranja County
 Koritna, Zagreb County